Salvia rubriflora is a perennial clump forming undershrub endemic to Colombia, growing on exposed grassy banks, near streams, and in dry bushland at elevations from . It is an uncommon plant, most often found at the Cundinamarca-Boyaca border.

Notes

rubriflora
Endemic flora of Colombia